A sex symbol is a sexually attractive celebrity.

Sex symbol may also refer to:
Gender symbol, a graphical symbol to denote gender
 An object or concept regarded to be symbolic of masculinity or femininity
Sex object (disambiguation)

See also
Sex Cymbal, a 1991 album by Sheila E.
"Sex Cymbal" (song), lead single from the album